Anarsia arsenopa is a moth of the  family Gelechiidae. It was described by Edward Meyrick in 1920. It is found in Kenya.

References

Endemic moths of Kenya
arsenopa
Moths described in 1920
Moths of Africa